Oracle Discoverer is a tool-set for ad hoc querying, reporting, data analysis, and Web-publishing for the Oracle Database environment.  Oracle Corporation markets it as a business intelligence product.  It was originally a stand-alone product, however it has become a component of the Oracle Fusion Middleware suite, and renamed Oracle Business Intelligence Discoverer.

Components 

The Discoverer product comprises:

 Discoverer Desktop    -  used to edit and run reports in a Windows client program
 Discoverer Plus       - used to edit and run reports in a web browser
 Discoverer Viewer     - used to run reports in a web browser.
 Discoverer Administrator
 Discoverer Catalog
 Discoverer End-User layer
 Discoverer Portlets
 Discoverer Portlet Provider

References

External links 
 Discoverer FAQ

Discoverer
Business intelligence software